The third season of All That ran from November 16, 1996, to October 25, 1997, and contained 20 episodes plus a music special episode.

Many changes to the show happened before the start of the season started. This was the only season recorded at Paramount Pictures after moving from Nickelodeon Studios, but before moving to Nickelodeon on Sunset.
Original cast member Angelique Bates did not return to the show after her contract had expired last season. The producers hired Amanda Bynes to fill the void in the cast. The producers also hired Tricia Dickson as a cast member midway through the season. However she was put into featured status and mostly played supporting roles during her short time on the show. This would also be the final season for Katrina Johnson and Alisa Reyes.

During the summer the film Good Burger was released. It was All Thats only feature film to be made based on a sketch that first aired on the show. The movie grossed more than 20 million dollars, but received generally negative reviews from critics. Mitchell and Thompson were the main stars of the film, while Denberg and Server had supporting roles in the film. Mitchell, Denberg, and Server reprised their roles from the Good Burger sketch in the film.

The intro remains the same as the first two seasons. However all of the Bates parts are edited out and are replaced with Bynes. New group shots of the entire cast were taped as well.

This was the first season to air on The N back in 2008, and it was the second season to air on The '90s Are All That on August 22, 2011.

This season was taped from July 1996 to February 1997

Cast

Repertory players
 Amanda Bynes
 Lori Beth Denberg
 Katrina Johnson (final episode: September 7, 1997)
 Kel Mitchell
 Alisa Reyes 
 Josh Server
 Kenan Thompson

Notes

Featured players
 Tricia Dickson (first episode: September 27, 1997)

Episodes

Special

References

1996 American television seasons
1997 American television seasons
All That seasons